Miss Collins is a 1924 portrait painting by Australian artist William Beckwith McInnes. The painting depicts Miss Gladys Neville Collins, the daughter of J.T. Collins, lawyer, Victorian State Parliamentary draughtsman, and trustee of the Public Library, Museums and National Gallery of Victoria.

The painting was awarded the 1924 Archibald Prize.

The painting was acquired by the Art Gallery of South Australia in 1930 through the Morgan Thomas Bequest Fund and remains part of its collection.

See also
The White Glove, a 1921 painting by George Washington Lambert of Gladys Neville Collins

References

Australian paintings
1924 paintings
Portraits by Australian artists
20th-century portraits
Collections of the Art Gallery of South Australia
Archibald Prize